The Shmenge Polka may refer to:

 "The Shemenge Polka", an episode of the comedy show Second City Television
 "The Shemenge Polka", an instrumental track by Raffi on his 1994 album Bananaphone